Open Kids is a Ukrainian pop group consisting of 5 girls.

History 

The band was officially formed on October 11, 2012, when the group released their first music video titled "Show Girls" 

On June 25, 2014 the group held a presentation event for their new music video "На Десерт" ("For Desert") in City Beach Club in Kyiv, Ukraine. The music video was shot in Germany.

In early November 2015, the public found out that Vika Vernik left Open Kids. In the same month it was revealed that the group announced casting for the fifth group member

In early December 2015 the band debuted on stage for the first time. The concert took place in Caribbean Club in Kyiv.

In February 2016 Open Kids presented their first song about love, "Кажется" ("It Seems").

In October 2020 members of Open Kids released IGTV video announcing they will no longer participate in group. Shortly after producers released casting info.

In 2021, a new lineup replaced the old one.

Members 
 Angie, born  
 Kvitka, born  
 Sandra, born  
 Monica, born  
 Toma, born

Former members 
 Angelina Romanovska, born  
 Lera Didkovskaya, born 
 Yulia Gamaliy, born 
 Anna Bobrovska, born 
 Elizaveta Kostyakina, born 
 Victoria Vernik, born 
 Anna Muzafarova, born in Chelyabinsk, Russia, on

Management 
The group is produced by Yuriy Petrov and Veronika Politaieva, the founders of Open Art Studio, a school of performing and fine arts in Kyiv.

Discography

Singles and selected songs

As featured artist 

[A] The Top Hit Weekly General chart's rankings are based on airplay on 230 radio stations in Russia, as well as 200 Russian-language radio stations all over the world (in Ukraine, the CIS countries, the Baltic states, Cyprus, Israel, Germany, the United States, and Canada).

Awards and nominations

References

External links 
 
 

Ukrainian musical groups
Child musical groups
Ukrainian girl groups
Musical groups established in 2012
Musical quintets
2012 establishments in Ukraine